Bifunctional 3'-phosphoadenosine 5'-phosphosulfate synthetase 2 is an enzyme that in humans is encoded by the PAPSS2 gene.

Sulfation is a common modification of endogenous (lipids, proteins, and carbohydrates) and exogenous (xenobiotics and drugs) compounds. In mammals, the sulfate source is 3'-phosphoadenosine 5'-phosphosulfate (PAPS), created from ATP and inorganic sulfate. Two different tissue isoforms encoded by different genes synthesize PAPS. This gene encodes one of the two PAPS synthetases. Defects in this gene cause the Pakistani type of spondyloepimetaphyseal dysplasia. Two alternatively spliced transcript variants that encode different isoforms have been described for this gene.

References

Further reading